Ramblin' with Mose is the sixth album to be released (but fourth recorded) by blues/jazz pianist and vocalist Mose Allison which was recorded in 1958 and released on the Prestige label.

Reception

Thom Jurek of Allmusic states, "Allison displays absolutely brilliant instrumental prowess as both an arranger and as an improviser. His unique, often unorthodox interpretations of standards and pop songs set him apart from virtually every one of his peers". The Penguin Guide to Jazz described the recording as "curiously disarming".

Track listing 
All compositions by Mose Allison except as indicated
 "I Got a Right to Cry" (Joe Liggins) - 2:48   
 "Old Devil Moon" (Burton Lane, Yip Harburg) - 5:08   
 "The Minstrels" - 3:27   
 "You Belong to Me" (Pee Wee King, Chilton Price, Redd Stewart) - 4:21   
 "Stranger in Paradise" (Robert Wright, George Forrest) - 5:26   
 "The Kissin' Bug" (Bill Eisenhauer, Diane Lampert, Horace Linsley) - 4:30   
 "Ramble" - 3:10   
 "Saritha" - 3:54   
 "Old Man John" - 2:17   
 "Ingenue" - 3:00   
 "Old Devil Moon" [Alternate Take] (Lane, Harburg) - 5:01 Bonus track on CD reissue   
 "Stranger in Paradise" [Alternate Take] (Wright, Forrest) - 5:49 Bonus track on CD reissue    
 "Ramble" [Alternate Take] - 3:24 Bonus track on CD reissue

Personnel 
Mose Allison - piano, vocals
Addison Farmer - bass
Ronnie Free - drums

References 

Mose Allison albums
1958 albums
Prestige Records albums
Albums produced by Bob Weinstock
Albums recorded at Van Gelder Studio